Tashaulovo (Taşawıl) is a rural locality (a village) in Taymeyevsky Selsoviet, Salavatsky District, Bashkortostan, Russia. The population was 187 as of 2010. There are 3 streets.

Geography 
Tashaulovo is located 54 km northwest of Maloyaz (the district's administrative centre) by road. Urmantau is the nearest rural locality.

References 

Rural localities in Salavatsky District